Gotti may refer to:

People with the name

People with the surname
 Gotti (surname), a surname (including a list of people with the name)

People with the stagename
 Irv Gotti, stage name of Irving Domingo Lorenzo Jr., American DJ and record producer
 Juan Gotti, stage name of Juan Ramos, Mexican-American rapper
 Mwata "Gotti" Mitchell, member of the American hip-hop duo Boo & Gotti
 Yo Gotti, stage name of Mario Mims (born 1981), American rapper
 Young Gotti, stage name of Ricardo Emmanuel Brown (born 1972), American rapper, also known as Kurupt

Arts, entertainment, and media
 Gotti (1996 film), a 1996 HBO television film directed by Robert Harmon
 Gotti (2018 film), starring John Travolta
 "Gotti" (song), a song by 6ix9ine
 Getting Gotti, a 1994 television film centered on a Brooklyn Assistant District Attorney Diane Giacalone
 Growing Up Gotti, an American reality television series that appeared on A&E